The 1932 season of the Mitropa Cup football club tournament was won by an Italian club for the first time. 

The winners were AGC Bologna; after they defeated the holders, First Vienna in the semi-finals, they were awarded the cup as the final was scratched after Juventus and Slavia Prague, who contested the other semi-final, were both ejected from the competition following stone throwing and a pitch invasion in Prague, in what has been described as the worst violence ever in the competition's history. In one incident, Slavia goalkeeper František Plánička was badly injured when he was hit by a stone thrown by a spectator. 

Despite the violence, Hugo Meisl, president of the Austrian Football Association, described the competition as a doubly valuable public magnet (Diese Mitropa-Cup-Konkurrenz erscheint ein doppelt schätzbarer Magnet für das Publikum zu sein).

This was the sixth edition of the tournament. Renato Cesarini of Juventus was the highest scorer with five goals.

Quarterfinals

|}

Semifinals

|}
1 The match was abandoned with Juventus leading 2-0 after the crowd, enraged Slavia had conceded two quick goals in the match and resorted to obstruction and time wasting, threw stones onto the pitch. After a stone hit and seriously injured Slavia goalkeeper František Plánička, Slavia's team walked off; both teams' fans invaded the pitch in response, leaving Slavia pinned in their dressing rooms for hours while 1,500 soldiers and policemen formed a cordon. Slavia Prague and Juventus FC were both ejected from the competition.

Finals

The final was scratched and Bologna were awarded the cup after Slavia Prague and Juventus were both ejected from the competition.

Top goalscorers

External links 
 Mitropa Cup results at Rec.Sport.Soccer Statistics Foundation

References

1932–33
1932–33 in European football
1932–33 in Austrian football
1932–33 in Italian football
1932–33 in Czechoslovak football
1932–33 in Hungarian football